"Again" is a song by American rock band Alice in Chains and the third single and sixth track from their self-titled 1995 album. It peaked at No. 8 on Billboard's Mainstream Rock Tracks chart, and was nominated for the Grammy Award for Best Hard Rock Performance in 1997. The song was included on the compilation albums Nothing Safe: Best of the Box (1999), Greatest Hits (2001), and The Essential Alice in Chains (2006). A remixed version of the song was included on the box set Music Bank (1999).

Release and reception
"Again" made its radio debut in February 1996, and peaked at No. 8 on the Billboard Mainstream Rock Tracks chart in the week of July 6, 1996. It also peaked at No. 36 on the Billboard Modern Rock Tracks chart.

The song was nominated for the Grammy Award for Best Hard Rock Performance in 1997.

In the liner notes of 1999's Music Bank box set collection, guitarist Jerry Cantrell said of the song:

Music video
The music video for "Again" was released in March 1996, and was directed by George Vale.

The music video was nominated for Best Hard Rock Video at the 1996 MTV Video Music Awards.

The video is available on the home video release Music Bank: The Videos, and is the final Alice in Chains music video that Layne Staley filmed with the band (the "Get Born Again" music video released in 1999 featured only archived footage of the singer).

Live performances
"Again" has been known to be performed with vocalist Layne Staley five times. They performed the song for the first on the TV show Saturday Night Special on April 20, 1996, and also for their appearance on the Late Show with David Letterman on May 10, 1996. The song was also performed during three of the four concerts that Alice in Chains opened for the reunited Kiss in late June and early July 1996.

A live performance of "Again" can be found on the live album Live (2000).

Since reuniting with new vocalist William DuVall in 2006, "Again" has become a regular part of the band's setlist.

Track listing
International CD single

Again remixes

Personnel
Layne Staley – lead vocals
Jerry Cantrell – guitars, vocals
Mike Inez – bass, vocals
Sean Kinney – drums, percussion

Chart positions

References

External links

"Again" on Setlist.fm
Cover art for SRCS 8248
Cover art for SRCS 8192
Cover art for SAMPCD3327

1995 songs
1996 singles
Alice in Chains songs
Songs written by Jerry Cantrell
Songs written by Layne Staley
Columbia Records singles
American hard rock songs